K. Krishnasamy is a physician, social worker and an Indian politician and former Member of the Legislative Assembly of Tamil Nadu. He founded the Puthiya Tamilagam party in 1999 and was elected to the Tamil Nadu legislative assembly from Ottapidaram constituency in 1996 election & And as Puthiya Tamilagam candidate in 2011 Alliance with ADMK PARTY

Political views 
Krishnasamy on 2019, supported the three language policy in Tamil Nadu and Hindi as a third language for Tamil students. Speaking at a function at the Immanuel Sekaran Memorial near Paramakudi in 2019 Krishnasamy said to his party youngsters, "Even if women of a different caste loves you, you should stay away. We have to move forward".

He supported NEET for Tamil Nadu in August 2017 in a demonstration when AIADMK, DMK and many other parties opposed it.  Former CPI(M) legislator K. Balabharathi accused him of hypocrisy, recalling that in 2011, the Krishnasamy had thanked then Chief Minister J Jayalalithaa for recommending a medical college seat for his daughter.

Krishnaswamy has supported many policies and positions espoused by the Bharatiya Janata Party (BJP). He has insisted that the Hindu Nationalist Rashtriya Swayamsevak Sangh (RSS) is a nationalist organisation and not a communal organization. He also claimed that there is no evidence the BJP government is trying to impose Hindi across India. His critics alleged that Krishnaswamy is appeasing the BJP and the RSS for personal gain.

Political career
He founded Puthiya Tamilagam, a political party based in Tamil Nadu, India.

The Puthiya Tamilagam contested the 1999 Lok Sabha elections and ten seats in the 2001 state assembly elections, the latter in alliance with the DMK. It won no seats in either case. InIn the 2009 elections to the Lok Sabha, K. Krishnasamy lost to P. Lingam of CPI.

For the 2011 state elections, it allied with the All India Anna Dravida Munnetra Kazhagam party and won two seats: K. Krishnasamy secured 71,330 votes in Ottapidaram constituency and A. Ramaswamy secured 75,124 votes in Nilakkottai constituency.

During the 2014 Lok Sabha elections Puthiya Tamilagam joined with the DMK as part of the Democratic Progressive Alliance. It contested just the Tenkasi constituency, where Krishnasamy lost by 161,774 votes to the AIADMK candidate, M. Vansanthi.

The Puthiya Tamilagam allied with the DMK for the 2016 state assembly elections and contested the seats of Ottapidaram, Srivilliputhur, Krishnarajapuram and Vasudevanallur. Krishnasamy lost to Sundarraj of the AIADMK by 493 votes in Ottapidaram.

2019 Lok Sabha election Puthiya Tamilagam party joined the AIADMK-BJP-PMK alliance in Tamil Nadu as part of the National Democratic Alliance. Puthiya Tamilagam was allocated one constituency to contest, with Krishnasamy standing in Tenkasi  for the sixth time.

Controversy 
When Krishnaswamy was asked at a press conference in May 2019 about his stance in the Bhartiya Janata Party's projects, including NEET and hydrocarbon exploration and the explanation for his failure in Tenkasi elections, Krishnaswamy claimed that the journalist who asked the question had further intentions and proceeded on to ask him what caste the journalist belonged to.  When asked why the journalist's caste was discussed when he was just doing his job of posing questions, Krishnasamy said, "The reporter kept repeating the same question. What's wrong with asking for one's caste? Is there no caste among all of you? "This led to a heated debate between him and the mediapersons, causing a controversy.

References

External links
Puthiya Tamilagam Party

1954 births
Living people
Tamil Nadu MLAs 1996–2001
Tamil Nadu MLAs 2011–2016
Janata Party politicians
People from Tiruppur district